Charles Broadbridge (christened 17 December 1798; died July 1841) was an English cricketer who played for Sussex. He was born and died in Duncton.

Broadbridge made a single first-class appearance, in 1838, against Marylebone Cricket Club. Batting in the lower-middle order, Broadbridge scored one run in the first innings and a duck in the second innings, partnering William Lillywhite, whose nephew James Lillywhite played in the first ever Test match.

External links
Charles Broadbridge at Cricket Archive 

1798 births
1841 deaths
English cricketers
Sussex cricketers
People from Duncton